It's Always Stormy In Tillamook is an EP by Meg & Dia, released independently by the band in 2010. The EP was recorded from May–June 2010 in Tillamook, Oregon. All songs were written and recorded by Meg & Dia Frampton.

Track listing

2010 EPs
Meg & Dia albums